Malchow is an Amt in the Mecklenburgische Seenplatte district, in Mecklenburg-Vorpommern, Germany. The seat of the Amt is in Malchow.

The Amt Malchow consists of the following municipalities:
 Alt Schwerin
 Fünfseen
 Göhren-Lebbin
 Malchow
 Nossentiner Hütte
 Penkow
 Silz
 Walow
 Zislow

Ämter in Mecklenburg-Western Pomerania
Mecklenburgische Seenplatte (district)